The Independent Research Fund Denmark, until 2017 known as Danish Council for Independent Research (Danish: Danmarks Frie Forskningsfond, formerly Det Frie Forskningsråd; DFF) of Denmark funds basic research and gives advice to government and parliament. The Danish Agency for Science, Technology and Innovation (DASTI) oversees its activity. As of 2012 the council has five sub-councils: Humanities, Medical Sciences, Natural Sciences, Social Sciences, and Technology and Production Sciences.

Mission
Independent Research Fund Denmark funds basic research within all scientific areas in a bottom-up manner, i.e. it funds ideas based on the researchers' own initiatives, as opposed to through thematic calls. Research projects which improve the quality and internationalisation of Danish research are prioritised, and the main funding criterion is scientific excellence. The DFF annually awards around 400 research projects of well over 1 billion DKK.

Organisation 
As of 2005, the Danish Research Agency (est. 2004) coordinates the DFF as well as the Danish Council for Strategic Research and the Danish Research Coordination Committee.
Independent Research Fund Denmark consists of a Board of Directors, with nine members, and of five scientific research councils: 
 Humanities, which covers basic research within all branches of culture, aesthetics, languages, history, and theory of cognition
 Natural Sciences, which covers the natural sciences, computer science and mathematics
 Medical Sciences, which covers basic scientific, clinical and socio-medical research in relation to human health and disease
 Social Sciences, which covers research within economy, sociology, political science, legal theory, and socio-scientific aspects of cross-disciplinary themes
 Technology and Production Sciences, which covers basic research within technology and production sciences

Funding schemes 
As of 2021, the DFF has following major funding schemes, along with some smaller ones:
 Sapere Aude: DFF-Starting Grant, aimed at funding top researchers to build a research group of researchers to carry out research at a high, international level, similarly to the ERC Starting Grant scheme
 Research Project 1 and 2, which fund clear and well-defined research questions. They differ in size: Project 1 supports one applicant, whereas Project 2 supports collaborative projects.
 International Postdoctoral Grant, to fund young researchers for research stays outside of Denmark

Other 
The council signed the Berlin Declaration on Open Access to Knowledge in the Sciences and Humanities in November 2011. In 2014 the DFF initiated a controversial  "experimental one-year government research-funding scheme specifically for women."

See also
 Open access in Denmark

References

This article incorporates information from the Danish Wikipedia.

Further reading
 

Government of Denmark
Research in Denmark